Dalia Rabin-Pelossof (born 19 March 1950) is a former Israeli politician. The daughter of former Prime Minister and Minister of Defense Yitzhak Rabin, she served as a member of the Knesset for the Centre Party, New Way and the Labor Party between 1999 and 2003.

Biography
Born in 1950, Rabin-Pelossof gained an LLB and worked as an attorney.

For the 1999 elections she was placed sixth on the Centre Party list, and entered the Knesset as the party won six seats. She was appointed chairwoman of the Ethics Committee.

On 6 March 2001 she and two other Centre Party MKs broke away to establish a new faction, New Way. The day after, she was appointed Deputy Minister of Defense in Ariel Sharon's new government.

On 26 March the other two New Way members resigned from the Knesset and were replaced by Centre Party MKs, leaving Rabin-Pelossof alone in the faction. On 7 May 2001 she joined One Israel, which later became Labor-Meimad. She resigned from her ministerial post on 1 August 2002. She lost her seat in the 2003 elections.

Rabin-Pelossof is married with two children. She is the chairperson of the Yitzhak Rabin Center.

References

External links

1950 births
Living people
Centre Party (Israel) politicians
Children of prime ministers of Israel
Deputy ministers of Israel
Israeli Jews
Israeli Labor Party politicians
Israeli lawyers
Israeli people of Belarusian-Jewish descent
Israeli people of German-Jewish descent
Israeli people of Ukrainian-Jewish descent
Women members of the Knesset
Members of the 15th Knesset (1999–2003)
New Way (Israel) politicians
Yitzhak Rabin
Tel Aviv University alumni
Israeli women lawyers
21st-century Israeli women politicians